John Moore (born 21 December 1943 in Harthill) is a Scottish former professional footballer, best known as a player for Luton Town.

Playing career

John Moore started his professional career with local club Motherwell, but after only three matches moved south to English Fourth Division team Luton Town. Moore made 274 league appearances for Luton, as the club rose to the Second Division during his time at the club. A loan spell at Brighton & Hove Albion in 1973 prompted his departure to Northampton Town, where he made 14 appearances before retiring from the game.

Non-playing career

Moore rejoined Luton as a coach under David Pleat, and in 1986 he was promoted to manager. During the 1986–87 season, he took Luton Town to a club-best seventh place in the First Division. He resigned after just one season in management because he did not feel that it was the right career for him. Moore returned in 1991 as a coach, and stayed on the club's staff until his 60th birthday in 2003. , he is first team coach at Bedford Modern School.

References

Living people
Scottish footballers
Motherwell F.C. players
Luton Town F.C. players
Brighton & Hove Albion F.C. players
Northampton Town F.C. players
Scottish football managers
Luton Town F.C. managers
1943 births
English Football League players
Scottish Football League players
English Football League managers
Association football defenders